The 2015 Strade Bianche was the first running of the Strade Bianche Donne, a one-day women's cycling race in Italy that was held on 7 March 2015. The race started in San Gimignano and finished on Siena's Piazza del Campo and was run entirely in the province of Siena, in the Chianti region of Tuscany. The inaugural edition was spun off the men's event, which started in 2007, and had a UCI rating of 1.1.

The event was won by American Megan Guarnier after distancing her team mate Lizzie Armitstead and Italian Elisa Longo Borghini during the final stretches of the race. Like the men's race, the women's race featured five gravel sectors, totalling .

Teams
16 teams competed in the race.

Results

See also
 2015 in women's road cycling

References

External links

2015 in women's road cycling
Strade Bianche
2015 in Italian sport